Cosimo Muci (May 14, 1920 in Novara - February 1992) was an Italian professional football player.

1920 births
1992 deaths
Italian footballers
Serie A players
Novara F.C. players
Inter Milan players
L.R. Vicenza players
Aurora Pro Patria 1919 players
Association football forwards